Dekanawida (YTB-831) is a United States Navy  named for the Great Peacemaker who, by tradition, was one of the founders of the Iroquois Confederacy. Dekanawida was the second US Navy ship to bear the name.

Construction

The contract for Dekanawida was awarded 5 June 1973. She was laid down on 22 January 1974 at Marinette, Wisconsin, by Marinette Marine and launched 12 September 1974.

Operational history
Dekanawida remained in active service at the Naval Station Guantanamo Bay, Cuba as late as April 1, 2015.

References

External links
 
 

 

Natick-class large harbor tugs
Ships built by Marinette Marine
1974 ships